Brenda Faulkner Shore (née Slade, 30 November 1922 – 18 June 1993) was a New Zealand botanist who attained the rank of Associate Professor before she retired in 1983.

Early life and education 
Shore was born in Auckland on 30 November 1922 to parents the Reverend Dr William Slade and Mary Eizabeth Wilhemina Slade née Faulkner. She attended primary school in Napier, and was at school when the 1931 Hawke's Bay earthquake hit, and watched the school's buildings collapse. Shore attended Wellington East Girls' College from 1936–1938, and then Epsom Girls' Grammar School from 1938–1940. In 1940, Shore was awarded the Cheeseman Memorial Prize, a nationally-awarded prize for a botanical project by a secondary school pupil, for a diary project describing the bush and gardens in Pukekohe that included watercolour illustrations.

University career 
Brenda enrolled at Auckland University College in 1941, and then at the University of Otago in 1943, from where she graduated with a Bachelor of Science in 1945. In 1945 the Botany Department at Otago was staffed by an assistant lecturer and a professor. John Holloway, the head of department, became suddenly ill and was forced to retire, and the assistant lecturer, Ella Campbell, had already resigned to take a position at Massey University, leaving the department with no teaching staff. The new Head, Geoff Baylis had been appointed but was not released by the Navy until August. Shore and two other recent women botany graduates, Elizabeth Batham and Margaret Cookson, pitched in to keep botany classes running when Holloway was about to cancel all classes for the year. Batham and Cookson delivered the Stage II and III lectures using Holloway's notes, while Shore took all the Stage I lectures and practicals, and laid out the material for senior practicals, and Ann Wylie assisted.

Shore was appointed as Assistant Lecturer in botany in 1945. She graduated with an M.Sc. in botany in 1949 with a thesis entitled Comparative anatomy of the cladode in New Zealand brooms, in which she was supervised by Geoff Baylis.

In 1952 Shore was awarded a Fellowship by the Federation of University Women, the first member of the New Zealand branch to gain one. The fellowship allowed her to undertake postgraduate study at Cambridge University, where she enrolled at Newnham College and in 1954 completed a PhD entitled Development of dicotyledonous leaves with special reference to their venation. She worked under botanist E. J. H. Corner. Shore specialised in leaf development and researched the breeding systems of New Zealand plants.

Back in Dunedin, Shore was promoted to lecturer in 1955, senior lecturer in 1960 and associate professor in 1971. In 1961, Shore took a sabbatical at Duke University in North Carolina, having received a postdoctoral fellowship from the American Association of University Women and a Fulbright Fellowship to assist with travel expenses. At Duke she worked with Jane Philpott on leaf development and lectured on plant anatomy and morphogenesis. 

At the time of her retirement in 1983, there were 370 University staff members across seven New Zealand universities at the level of Associate Professor or reader, but only 20 of them were women.

Shore also painted plants, and was an accomplished  member of the Otago Art Society, holding a solo exhibition at Abernethy's Gallery in Dunedin in 1982. Shore's 1978 guide to identifying plants and trees around Otago was illustrated with many fine line-drawings by her.

Shore died on 18 June 1993.

Legacy 
When she retired in 1983, Shore arranged a scholarship, the Brenda Shore Award for Women, which is $15,000 awarded annually to support women with "passion and energy" for the natural sciences. The Shore family also established the Shore Trust, which supports botany research at the University. In 2017 Shore was selected as one of the Royal Society Te Apārangi's 150 women in 150 words.

Selected works

References

External links 

 Photograph of Brenda Shore at the University of Otago

New Zealand women academics
Scientists from Auckland
New Zealand women botanists
Academic staff of the University of Otago
Alumni of Newnham College, Cambridge
People educated at Epsom Girls' Grammar School
1922 births
1993 deaths
20th-century New Zealand botanists
20th-century New Zealand women scientists